The men's 3000 metres event  at the 1992 European Athletics Indoor Championships was held in Palasport di Genova on 28 February and 1 March.

Medalists

Results

Heats
First 3 from each heat (Q) and the next 4 fastest (q) qualified for the final.

Final

References

3000 metres at the European Athletics Indoor Championships
3000